() is a German noun translated as "longing", "desire", "yearning", or "craving". Some psychologists use the word to represent thoughts and feelings about all facets of life that are unfinished or imperfect, paired with a yearning for ideal alternative experiences.

Etymology and language change
A suffering reference of the word Sehnsucht in Middle High German usage is associated with "Siechtum" in the German dictionary as follows: Weakening the disease reference, the word later denoted the high "degree of a violent and often painful longing for something, especially when one has no hope of attaining what is desired, or when attainment is uncertain, still distant."

The word "Sehnsucht" is used as a Germanism in some other languages. Because of its vagueness, analogous terms cannot easily be cited. Portuguese language has the similar but not identical term saudade.

Sehnsucht in mythology 
In Greek mythology, the Erotes are the gods of loving Sehnsucht, found with Eros in the company of Aphrodite.

A mythical explanation of Sehnsucht is offered by the myth of so-called Kugelmenschen, mythical creatures that are some sort of spherical men, which the philosopher Plato has narrated in his fictional, literary dialogue Symposium(The Banquet). The inventor of the myth is Plato himself, but he has utilized old mythical motifs. The core idea also occurs in non-European myths. Plato's fictional narrator is the famous comedy poet Aristophanes, who, like the other participants in the banquet of which the dialogue is about, gives a speech about Eros. According to the myth, humans originally had spherical hulls as well as four hands and feet and two faces on one head. In their wantonness they wanted to storm the sky. For this, Zeus punished them by cutting each of them in half. These halves are the people of today. They suffer from their incompleteness; each one is looking for the lost other half. The longing for the former wholeness is shown in the form of erotic desire, which aims at union. Some spherical men were entirely male, others entirely female, still others - the androgynoi Androgynos - had a male and a female half. The entirely male ones originally descended from the sun, the entirely female ones from the earth, and the androgynous ones from the moon. With this different nature of the sphere-men, Plato's Aristophanes explains the differences in sexual orientation. Only the humans originating from androgynoi are heterosexually oriented.

In psychology 

 utopian conceptions of ideal development;
 sense of incompleteness and imperfection of life;
 conjoint time focus on the past, present, and future;
 ambivalent (bittersweet) emotions;
 reflection and evaluation of one's life; and
 symbolic richness.

In a cross-cultural study conducted to determine whether the German concept of  could be generalized to the United States, four samples of American and German participants “rated their 2 most important life longings and completed measures of subjective well-being and health.” German and American participants did not differ in their ability to identify life longings or the intensity of their . However, German participants associated it more with unattainable, utopian states while Americans reported the concept as not as important to everyday life.

Some researchers posit that  has a developmental function that involves life management. By imagining overarching and possibly unachievable goals, individuals may be able to create direction in their life by developing more tangible goals, or “stepping stones” that will aid them on their path toward their ideal self. "[ has] important developmental functions, including giving directionality for life planning and helping to cope with loss and important, yet unattainable wishes by pursuing them in one's imagination."  It can also operate as a self-regulatory mechanism.

However, in a study that attempted to discover whether  played an active role in one's ability to influence their own development, psychologists asked 81 participants to report “their most important personal goals and life longings, and [evaluate] these with respect to their cognitive, emotional, and action-related characteristics.” Results showed that goals were perceived as more closely linked to everyday actions, and as such more controllable. , on the other hand, was reported as more related to the past and future, and therefore more emotionally and developmentally ambiguous.

Also, in a study conducted in 2009, 168 middle-aged childless women were asked to rate their wish for children according to intensity and attainability. If the women rated their wish as intense and long-standing, their wish was considered a life-longing. If they rated their wish as intense and attainable, it was simply a goal. “The pursuit of the wish for children as a life longing was positively related to well-being only when participants had high control over the experience of this life longing and when other self-regulation strategies (goal adjustment) failed.”

In popular culture 
's "" was set to music by multiple composers, including Ludwig van Beethoven.

Longing, specifically longing for some unknown joy, is a central idea in many of the books by C. S. Lewis, such as his autobiography Surprised by Joy (1955).

Richard Strauss composed a setting of Detlev von Liliencron's poem "Sehnsucht" in 1896 (Opus 32, number 2).

Sehnsucht appears in the title of two songs by Einstürzende Neubauten, Sehnsucht (1981), from Kollaps, and Sehnsucht - Zitternd (1985), from Halber Mensch.

Sehnsucht (1997) is the title of the second album, and title track of that album, by the German metal band Rammstein.
 
Sehnsucht (2009) is the title of an album by the German gothic metal band Lacrimosa.

In 2011, the film director Badran Roy Badran treated the concept of Sehnsucht in his feature film A Play Entitled Sehnsucht.

See also 
 
 
 Peak experience
 Romanticism

References

Bibliography

External links 
 C. S. Lewis on Joy, Sehnsucht, Longing and True Myth
 Joy and Sehnsucht
 Sehnsucht: The C. S. Lewis Journal
 An English description of the word by a German native speaker
 "Sehnsucht" song texts at The LiederNet Archive

Scores at the International Music Score Library Project 

 
 
 
 
 
 
 
 
 
 
 
 
 
 
 
 
 
 

Emotions
German words and phrases
Suffering
Melancholia
Words and phrases with no direct English translation
Nostalgia